The 2020–21 National League season, known as the Vanarama National League for sponsorship reasons, is the sixth season under English football's new title of the National League, the eighteenth season consisting of three divisions, and the forty-second season overall.

The season follows the curtailed 2019–20 season, in which the league phase was uncompleted due to the COVID-19 pandemic and the play-offs only completed by 2 August 2020. Reflecting the late end to the previous season and aiming at maximising the likelihood of fans being present in stadiums when the season starts, the 2020–21 National League began on 3 October 2020. The planned increase of the North and South divisions to 24 teams was scheduled to take place for 2021–22, meaning only two from the North and one from the South were to be relegated to the premier divisions of the Northern Premier League, Southern League Central or South, or Isthmian League. However, due to the cessation and voidance of the 2020–21 seasons for the North and South divisions, promotion and relegation was suspended. For that reason, the expansion plans were deferred to 2022–23, when they would be implemented before that season.

National League

On 16 September 2020, Macclesfield Town folded as a result of debts, and were expelled from the National League on 29 September 2020. As the club folded before the season started, no records were expunged. 

Due to Macclesfield's closure, only 23 clubs took part in the 2020–21 season and a maximum of three clubs were to be relegated instead of the usual four. However, on 26 March 2021, having not fulfilled a fixture since 30 January, Dover Athletic's results were expunged and the club deducted 12 points for the 2021–22 season. Therefore the season is set to complete with 22 clubs playing fixtures. 

Additionally, following the National League North and South divisions being declared null and void on 18 February, no teams were relegated this season.

Promotion and relegation

Team changes

To National League
Promoted from 2019–20 National League North
 King's Lynn Town
 Altrincham

Promoted from 2019–20 National League South
 Wealdstone
 Weymouth

Relegated from 2019–20 League Two
 Macclesfield Town

From National League
Promoted to 2020–21 League Two
 Barrow
 Harrogate Town

Relegated to 2020–21 National League North
 AFC Fylde
 Chorley

Relegated to 2020–21 National League South
 Ebbsfleet United

Stadia and locations

Personnel and sponsoring 

   Yeovil Town club captain Lee Collins died on 31 March 2021 at the age of 32.

Managerial changes

National League table

Results table

Play-offs

Quarter-finals

Semi-finals

Final

Top scorers

Hat-tricks

Monthly awards

Each month the Motorama National League announces their official Player of the Month and Manager of the Month.

National League North

The National League North in 2020-21 consisted of 22 teams. Due to the initially anticipated expansion to 24 teams for 2021–22, only two teams instead of the usual four were expected to be relegated. However, the knock-on effect of Macclesfield Town's closure might have caused the number of relegated teams to be reduced even further.

The league was declared null and void on 18 February 2021. As a result, all records were expunged and no teams were promoted or relegated.

Team changes
Following the COVID-19 pandemic-related cancellation of the four step 3 leagues' 2019–20 seasons, no teams were promoted to or relegated from the National League North.

To National League North
Relegated from 2019–20 National League
 AFC Fylde
 Chorley

From National League North
Promoted to 2020–21 National League
 King's Lynn Town
 Altrincham

Stadia and locations

Managerial changes

National League North table

Results

Top scorers

Hat Tricks

Monthly awards

Each month the Motorama National League announces their official Player of the Month and Manager of the Month.

National League South

The National League South consisted of 21 teams. Following Bury's expulsion from the English Football League in 2019, and the completion of the 2019–20 National League with two northern and one southern teams in the relegation zone, the division was left one team short. With the initially anticipated expansion to 24 teams for 2021–22, only one team was expected to be relegated.

The league was declared null and void on 18 February 2021. As a result, all records were expunged and no teams were promoted or relegated.

Team changes
Following the COVID-19 pandemic-related cancellation of the four step 3 leagues' 2019–20 seasons, no teams were promoted to or relegated from the National League South.

To National League South
Relegated from 2019–20 National League
Ebbsfleet United

From National League South
Promoted to 2020–21 National League
 Wealdstone
 Weymouth

Stadia and locations

Managerial changes

National League South table

Results table

Top scorers

Hat Tricks

Monthly awards

Each month the Motorama National League announces their official Player of the Month and Manager of the Month.

References 

2020–21 National League
5
Eng
Eng